Slovaks in the Czech Republic are the country's second-largest ethnic minority; after the Moravians, who are native to the Czech Republic. The American CIA puts them at 1.9% of the country's total population. Larger numbers of them can be found in the country's east, especially Ostrava and Brno; as the Czech Republic shares a border in the east with Slovakia.

Notable people 
 Andrej Babiš, Czech politician and businessman of Slovak origin
 Erik Daniel, Czech footballer of Slovak origin

See also 
Demographics of the Czech Republic

References

Ethnic groups in the Czech Republic
Slovak minorities in Europe